Margaret Powell (1907 – April 1984) was an English writer. Her book about her experiences in domestic service, Below Stairs, became a best-seller and she went on to write other books and became a television personality. Below Stairs was an impetus for Upstairs, Downstairs and the basis of Beryl's Lot, and is one of the inspirations of Downton Abbey.

Early life and domestic service
Ellen Margaret Steer's father Harry was seasonally employed as a house painter, and her mother Florence was a charwoman. Her parents and her grandmother lived in three rooms in Hove, Sussex, and she had six siblings. When she was 13 and won a scholarship to grammar school, her parents could not afford to allow her to take it up. She went to work in a laundry until she was 15 and became a maid, first locally and a year later in London. Since she had experience cooking at home and hated needlework, she became a kitchen maid instead of the slightly more prestigious position of under-housemaid.

After "set[ting] about [finding a husband] as if it were an extra household duty, like hulling five pounds of strawberries or mopping the linoleum floor", she escaped domestic service by marrying a milkman, Albert Powell. When her three sons were in grammar school, towards the end of the Second World War, she became a maid once more. Eventually, "when I realised I had nothing to talk about with my eldest son, who was preparing to go to university", she took evening school courses in philosophy, history and literature, passed her O-levels at 58, and went on to A-levels, passing the English A-level in 1969.

Writing career and later life
She published her memoir, Below Stairs, in 1968. It sold well, 14,000 copies in its first year, and was followed by other autobiographical books beginning the following year. She also wrote some novels. She became a popular guest on television talkshows. When she died in April 1984 at 76 after suffering from cancer, she left a substantial estate of £77,000.

In he birthplace of Hove there is a bus named after her and a blue plaque on her house.

Below Stairs
Below Stairs was one of a wave of working-class memoirs beginning in the 1950s, and is about class—she writes, "We always called them 'Them'"— but "defiantly individualistic" rather than socialist. Powell is bitter about the injustice of her situation, "very good at dramatising ... mortifying moments", and "throws the last shovel of dirt on the myth of the devoted help and their unfailing love and respect for the stately home". The book "prompted a storm of hurt letters". However, she has no time for politics and instead focusses on beating the odds: "Those people who say the rich should share what they've got are talking a lot of my eye and Betty Martin; it's only because they haven't got it they think that way ... [I]f I had it I'd hang on to it too". The Wall Street Journal'''s reviewer in 2012 called her "admirably feisty" and "wittily scathing of the class-bound cant conditioning Britain in the early decades of the 20th century".Below Stairs inspired the television series Upstairs, Downstairs,Neal Justin, Variety, "Abbey's road; The wit and wisdom of writer Julian Fellowes makes season two of 'Downton Abbey' an absolute masterpiece", Star Tribune, 8 January 2012 (at Highbeam; subscription required) which was created by two actresses whose mothers had also been "in service". The series Beryl's Lot was based on it, and it was one of the inspirations of the series Downton Abbey, which began in 2011. It was reissued that year in the UK as Below Stairs: The Bestselling Memoirs of a 1920s Kitchen Maid and in 2012 published for the first time in the US as Below Stairs: The Classic Kitchen Maid's Memoir That Inspired "Upstairs, Downstairs" and "Downton Abbey".

Selected publications and reissues
 Below Stairs. London: Peter Davies, 1968. 
 Below Stairs: the bestselling memoirs of a 1920s kitchen maid. London: Pan Macmillan, 2011. 
 Below Stairs: the classic kitchen maid's memoir that inspired "Upstairs, Downstairs" and "Downton Abbey". New York: St Martin's Press, 2012. 
 Climbing the Stairs. London: Peter Davies, 1969. 
 Climbing the Stairs; From Kitchen Maid to Cook: the heartwarming memoir of a life in service. London: Pan, 2011. 
 The Margaret Powell Cookery Book. London: Peter Davies, 1970 
 Margaret Powell's London Season. London: Peter Davies, 1971 
 The Treasure Upstairs''. London: Peter Davies, 1970

References

1907 births
1984 deaths
English autobiographers
People from Hove
Writers from London
Deaths from cancer in England
Maids
English domestic workers
20th-century English novelists
English memoirists